Metastatia azurea is a moth of the subfamily Arctiinae. It was described by Percy Ireland Lathy in 1899. It is found in Ecuador.

References

 

Arctiinae
Moths described in 1899